Lee Shin-young (born January 24, 1998) is a South Korean model and actor. He rose to fame with the Korean television series Crash Landing on You (2019), How to Buy a Friend (2020), and Rookie Cops (2022).

Early life
Lee was born on January 24, 1998, in South Korea.

Career

2018–present: Acting debut
Lee made his acting debut in the web series Just One Bite (2018). He went on to roles in It's Okay To Be Sensitive 2 (2019) and Just One Bite 2 (2019). He played First Lieutenant Park Kwang-beom in the hit drama Crash Landing on You. Lee also starred in the KBS drama How to Buy a Friend alongside Shin Seung-ho in 2020 and Rookie Cops as Kim Tak in 2022.

Filmography

Film

Television series

Web series

Music video appearances

Music drama

Awards and nominations

References

External links
  (in Korean)
 
 
 

1998 births
Living people
South Korean male television actors
South Korean male web series actors
21st-century South Korean male actors